USS APL-31 is an APL-17-class barracks ship of the United States Navy.

Construction and career
The ship was laid down on 1 June 1944, by the Everett-Pacific Shipbuilding & Dry Dock Co. and launched on 30 September 1944. She was commissioned on 14 June 1945.

In April 1948, she was acquired by the United States Naval Academy.

The ship was towed out to sea and later sunk as an artificial reef on 23 July 2001. The wreck is now a scuba diving destination off the New Jersey coast.

Awards 
American Campaign Medal 
World War II Victory Medal  
National Defense Service Medal

References

 

 

Barracks ships of the United States Navy
Ships built in Everett, Washington
1944 ships
Maritime incidents in 2001
Ships sunk as artificial reefs
Ships sunk as dive sites
Shipwrecks of the New Jersey coast
Scuttled vessels